Grant writing is the practice of completing an application process for a financial grant provided by an institution such as a government department, corporation, foundation, or trust. Such application processes are often referred to as either a grant proposal or a grant submission. Successful grant writing requires a clear understanding of grantsmanship. While the principles and fundamentals of grantsmanship apply broadly, consistently successful grant writers are able not only to mobilize knowledge about the form and content of the proposal documents, but also the intertextual relationships of the specific proposal to other, related documents (e.g., the funding agency's own mission statement and current projects, correspondence with agency personnel, supplementary materials, budgets, general and agency-specific writing guidelines, etc.).

The elements of proposal-creation typically involve:
 Analyzing the intended audience for the proposal
 Analyzing the purpose of the proposal
 Gathering information about the subject of the proposal
 Writing the proposal
 Formatting the proposal
 Revising, editing, and proofreading the proposal
 Submitting the proposal
As with any writing process, all elements (before the submission of the final version) are less discrete stages than they are overlapping and often recursive activities.

Background
A grant proposal normally requests funding to support activities that are consistent with the mission of the agency applying for the grant. Many large corporations have philanthropic programs offering grants to help local colleges and universities, arts organizations, and social services. All background information should be gathered prior to writing a proposal. Many large grant-making institutions provide such information for prospective grant seekers on their websites. However, smaller grant-makers (including the majority of private foundations) do not maintain their own websites; in such cases, the background information can primarily be found by researching the giving histories of those foundations. Such information is primarily found in the Form 990 that grant-makers are required to publish. Also, it is helpful to know the name of a key contact in the organization to determine where the information is located.  Several of the grant writing steps can be combined into one, as part of the creation process, like writing, formatting, and revising the proposal. The number of steps for proposal creation may depend on the timeline given for the creation of the proposal as well as the type of funder.

Within project grants, there are fellowships, scholarships, research grants, training grants, experimental and demonstration grants, evaluation grants, planning grants, technical assistant grants, and many others. Grant funders include the federal government, state and local governments, private foundations, corporations, and individuals. Grants are often announced online through a request for proposals/applications, which specifies the nature and cost of the program that must be proposed. These documents are issued by a public or private funding agency, inviting qualified organizations to submit a proposal for a specific funding opportunity. They typically include guidelines, due dates, and more required information.

Identifying an appropriate potential grant maker can be one of the most challenging parts of the grant writing process. In the United States, the two primary sources of funds are government grants and  foundation grants. Grants.gov is the best place to start a search for grants available through the federal government. Searches can also be filtered by agency. "Foundations" can be broken down into several categories: community foundations (they often consist of several or many individual funds, each directed by a separate governing body), private nonprofit foundations and small family foundations. It is wise for grant seekers to identify as many foundation prospects as possible and then study the guidelines of each to see which are a good fit, before spending the time required to submit an application. This can be accomplished by studying the guidelines of the foundations via their websites, by calling to personally speak with a program officer, and by reviewing what they have given grant money to in the past.

Audience analysis
Successful grant proposals focus on the mission and interests of the funding organization. A good audience analysis allows the grant writer the opportunity to better tailor the content of the proposal to ensure it follows the ideas of the funding organization. When submitting a proposal to an organization in another culture, it is important to understand cultural differences and how they can inform the applicant's approach. Proper cultural awareness ensures a persuasive argument that is free of cultural misunderstandings. If a language barrier exists, appropriate time may be allotted in the grant proposal writing schedule. This will result in copy that respects the conventions and styles found within the funding organization.

Another helpful way of avoiding misunderstanding when displaying facts and data in a proposal is to use short sentences, simple vocabulary avoiding jargon, and local conventions regarding punctuation, spelling, and mechanics. Successful graphs use captions and proper colors. A good label to a graph or chart helps avoid misunderstandings when reading, and saves the reader the task of looking back at the text in order to know what the graphics mean. The graphics should not only be well-designed but should also have colors that are suitable for the eye and that are only used to represent data and not decorate it. Color in graphs should achieve something in particular—something that serves the goal of communication. Dressing up a graph might serve a purpose in advertising, but it only distracts people from what's important—the data—in an information display. Data in charts should be explicit and clearly categorized.

Purpose analysis
Once the purpose of the proposal has been carefully discussed and established by the writer, the executive board, and the team that will carry out the project, writing a list of specific outcomes that will surge from the proposal will be the next step to follow. The list will specifically help the writer to narrow down the order the project outcomes should be listed and how much detail should go into each one of them. When choosing what outcomes to list in the proposal, it is important that they reflect how they benefit the funding company.

While specific demands and formatting vary from one request for proposal to the next, core elements to establish and communicate are:

 Who is making the request, including why they are qualified to make such a request and be trusted to produce a promised outcome.
 Step-by-step plan for exactly what will take place once funding is established, including the end goal/expected completion and when. 
 Detailed budget listing all aspects of the endeavor and their costs, including any spreadsheets or other info-graphics that illuminate the projected costs.

Drafting and formatting
The drafting and formatting steps of the proposal writing process go hand in hand. It may be more helpful to draft the proposal according to the guidelines that proposals require. The structure of a proposal varies according to the type of proposal, the type of project, and the organization.

Structure
Strucrure of grant writing should be clear.

Summary
The major components of the proposal should be identified in this section. Because the summary is the first section of the proposal, it should be short, yet explicit enough to describe the problem or opportunity, solution, outcomes, timeline, expenses, and qualifications, while keeping the attention of the reader. It is important to use clear vocabulary to convey a persuasive message.  The Foundation Center recommends the problem to be explained in one to two paragraphs. It should include a statement regarding a problem or opportunity that the applicant organization is ready to address. The solution should include a brief, yet explicit description of the project, its logistics, and benefits the program will provide once it is in place. The expenses should also be briefly discussed in this section. They should include the amount of funding required for the project, along with sustainability message that discusses the future plans for funding the project once the grant period ends. Such information should be conveyed in one paragraph. Finally, the organization's qualifications and credentials section should include a brief history of the organization, their purpose and activities, along with the credentials of any personnel that will be focusing on the project.

Introduction
The context, scope, and organization of the proposal is found in this section. Usually the introduction includes a brief description of the problem or opportunity, also known as the statement of need, the purpose of the proposal, the background of the problem or opportunity, sources of information, scope of the proposal, organization of the proposal, and key terms used in the proposal. Having the key terms in the introduction is a helpful way of avoiding the reader any confusion. Because the statement of need allows the reader to understand the applying organization's request and needs it to be clearly stated in the introduction. The Foundation Center lists in their website the following aspects to consider when writing the statement of need: what facts and/or statistics best support the project, give the reader hope, decide if the project should be showcased as a model, determine whether the need should be portrayed as acute, decide if it can be demonstrated that the proposed project or program addresses the need differently or better than other projects that preceded it, avoid presenting the absence of the proposed solution as the actual problem (circular reasoning).

Plan of work
The solution to the problem or opportunity is presented in this section as a plan. If the plan requires some type of research, this section is where such information should be mentioned, along with statistics and examples. Also, any type of action should be justified with supporting data. The timeline for the plan or work should also be included in the plan of work. If the schedule is detailed enough to be included in a chart, it should be included as an appendix. A successful plan of work should mention the measurable outcomes of the project. They should be specific, concrete, and achievable. The methods section includes a detailed description of the project along with a specific timeline and reasoning behind the methods of action that have been chosen for the project. The methods section enables the reader to visualize how the project will accomplish the objectives described on the grant proposal. If staffing is mentioned under the methods section, a few sentences should be devoted in order to expand on the specifics of the staffing process. Another section to include under plan of work is the evaluation portion of the project. The evaluation aspect usually comes in when the project has been completed to ensure the measurable goals have been achieved, and to find ways to better achieve the goals that were not reached. Lastly, a statement of the project's sustainability after the grant period is over should be mentioned to ensure reader interest, and showcase that the project is one to succeed.

Budget
The costs of the work plan should be carefully described under this section. While the main financial data will be developed after the proposal has been created and approved, this section should include a broad outline of the budget in order to make sure the expenses are reasonable and proportionate to the outcomes that are anticipated by the proposal. Depending on the type of costs, there can be a division between direct costs (salaries, travel costs, necessary materials, equipment, and supplies) and indirect costs (intangible expenses).

Qualifications and experience
A description of the qualifications of those carrying out the work plan should be carefully described under this section. The more complex the project, the more detailed the qualifications should be. A company brochure can be used to showcase the company information. If using a prepared statement, it should not take longer than two pages. The statement should mention the company's creation, its mission, structure, programs, leadership, and special expertise. A discussion of the size of the boards may be included, as well as a process of recruitment of members, and their level of participation. Also, it may be beneficial to include the kinds of activities and services provided by the organization, and the type of audience they serve.

Appendices
Information that is not included in the proposal such as charts and graphics are included in this section. If using charts and/ or tables, captions need to be included. Other types of appendixes include letters of support that serve as testimonial to the organization's skills. The letters should be written by a reputable and well-known person in the field. Also, if a full board list will be included in the proposal, it should be included in the appendix.

Once the grant proposal is submitted there may be a few more steps to be followed by the applicant organization including following up with the funding organization. Many foundation grant makers and some government funders try to make a visit before they make a decision on a proposal, so a professional attitude is always needed from the applicant organization.

Post Award Phase
Grant writing doesn't end at acceptance. The post award phase is the last part of the lifecycle of a grant. This is usually handled by the grant writer/s that worked on the grant proposal and is therefore a part of grant writing. There exists an entire list of audit requirements for each grant that must be met. This phase of the process ensures transparency, which helps fight fraud and funding misuse. Any organization that receives more than $750,000 in federal grant funding can submit to one overall audit a year, but organizations that receive less must submit one audit per grant received. The closeout of the award does not happen until this step is completed.

References

External links
US federal government grants 
How to Develop and Write a Grant Proposal
A guide for proposal writing from the US National Science Foundation
Short guide for the preparation of grant applications for the US National Institutes of Health (PDF from the US National Cancer Institute)
NASA guidebook for proposal submission

Grants (money)